Tarry Flynn is a novel by Irish poet and novelist Patrick Kavanagh, set in 1930s rural Ireland. The book is based on Kavanagh's experience as a young farmer in Monaghan. The novel however is set in Cavan. The story is based on the life of a young farmer poet and his quest for big fields, young women and the meaning of life.

Publication history
Kavanagh began writing Tarry Flynn in 1940 under the title Stony Grey Soil. It was, however, rejected. After his collection of poetry A Soul for Sale, containing the poem The Great Hunger, was published to great acclaim in February 1947, he set about revising the novel and spent the summer of 1947 working on it. It was published by The Pilot Press in November 1948. The novel was banned by the Irish Censorship Board for being "indecent and obscene". The ruling was overturned following a challenge by the publisher, although the novel did not return to publication until the 1960s.

The novel was produced as a play at the Abbey Theatre, Dublin in 1966, adapted by P.J O'Connor. It was adapted for the stage again in 1997 by Conall Morrison.

The novel was published in Penguin Modern Classics in 2000 with the typographic error "Tarry Flyn" on the cover and spine.

Quotations of Tarry Flynn were sprayed on the walls of O'Connell street in Limerick during 2009, as graffiti.

References

External links
Tarry Flynn at PenguinClassics

1948 novels
Fiction set in the 1930s
Culture in County Cavan
Novels by Patrick Kavanagh
Novels set in Ireland
Irish novels adapted into plays